This article is a list of historic places in western Newfoundland. These properties are entered on the Canadian Register of Historic Places, whether they are federal, provincial, or municipal. The list contains entries from communities in census divisions 4, 5, and 9, encompassing the western portions of the island of Newfoundland.

List of historic places

See also
 List of historic places in Newfoundland and Labrador
 List of National Historic Sites of Canada in Newfoundland and Labrador

Lists of historic places in Newfoundland and Labrador